Karnela Scekic (Serbian Cyrillic: Карнела Шћekић, born on May 8, 1985, in Bijelo Polje, Montenegro, she lives in Ulcinj) is Montenegrin model. She was the 2008 Miss Globe Montenegro Winner, 2008 Miss Globe International Contestant; the 2009 Miss 7 Continents Contestant: 3rd Runner Up Miss 7 Continents, Miss Bikini Miss 7 Continents, Best in Figure and Face of Ararat Hall; the 2009 The Look Of The Year Contestant. Besides she still works as a model, she became a national director and manager for Miss Globe Montenegro and Balcan manager of The Look Of The Year.,

Professional career
When she was 16, in 2003, Karnela became a model of Elite Model Look Agency in Serbia and Montenegro and continued working many fashion weeks ( Verica Rakocevic, Marina Banovic Nikolic, Aleksandra Cicmil, Jelena Djukanovic, Rocco Barocco, Vuica, Kara, Anton Giulio Grande, Fahrad Re, Conti Taguali, Renato Balestra and many others). She represented Montenegro in many beauty contests: Year Face Montenegro 2007, Miss of Public 2007, Miss Adriatic Europe 2008 in Croatia, Miss Globe Montenegro 2008, Mis Globe International 2008 in Albania, Tirana, Miss 7 Continents 2009 in Armenia, Yerevan, The Look Of The Year 2009 in Italy, Sicily, Taormina. After these competitions Karnela has gotten the licence to become national director and manager of Montenegro for Miss Globe Organization( from January 1, 2010). Global president is Rasim Aydin from Istanbul, Turkey. Another licence is given by the president of The Look Of The Year Competition, Ivana Triolo.

References

External links
 / Miss Globe Montenegro
 / Miss Globe International
 / Miss7 Continents

Living people
1985 births
Montenegrin female models
20th-century Montenegrin people
20th-century Montenegrin women
21st-century Montenegrin people
21st-century Montenegrin women